Queets is an unincorporated community and census-designated place (CDP) in Grays Harbor and Jefferson counties, Washington, United States. The population was 174 at the 2010 census. The primary residents of the community are Native Americans of the Quinault Indian Nation.

Geography
It is near the coast of the Pacific Ocean along the Queets River at the northern edge of the Quinault Indian Reservation. Queets now consists of several homes, a store, gas station, fisheries, daycare, Head Start, and a remote office for the Quinault Nation. Other local attractions include the Pacific beach hiking trails, Olympic National Park, and Olympic National Forest.

U.S. Route 101 passes through Queets, crossing the Queets River at the northern edge of the community. Southbound US 101 leads east  to Amanda Park and southeast  to Aberdeen.

Demographics
At the 2010 census, more than 95% of the population identified their race as American Indian.

History

References

Census-designated places in Grays Harbor County, Washington
Census-designated places in Washington (state)
Populated coastal places in Washington (state)
Quinault settlements